Woods–Evertz Stove Company Historic District, also known as General Wesco Stove Company, is a historic industrial complex and national historic district located at Springfield, Greene County, Missouri. The district encompasses six contributing buildings associated with a large cast iron stove manufacturer. The district developed between about 1904 and 1953, and all six buildings are in a simple industrial, factory style, with minimal architectural embellishment and have flat, low-pitch and gabled roofs.

It was added to the National Register of Historic Places in 2003.

See also 
 Dortch Stove Works: NRHP-listed stove factory in Franklin, Tennessee
 Southern Stove Works:  NRHP-listed stove factory in Richmond, Virginia

References

Historic districts on the National Register of Historic Places in Missouri
Industrial buildings and structures on the National Register of Historic Places in Missouri
Buildings and structures in Springfield, Missouri
National Register of Historic Places in Greene County, Missouri
Stoves